John G. Page III (January 18, 1950 – December 14, 2020) was an American politician who served in the Alabama House of Representatives from the 29th district from 1993 to 2010.

Biography
Page was born in Kokura, Kyushu, Japan. He received his associate degree from Gadsden State Community College and his bachelor's degree from Jacksonville State University. He served in the United States Marine Corps during the Vietnam War. Page was a teacher, firefighter, and businessman. Page served on the Gadsden City Council.

Page had surgery in June 2020. He died of COVID-19 in Gadsden, Alabama, on December 14, 2020, at age 70, during the COVID-19 pandemic in Alabama.

References

1950 births
2020 deaths
People from Gadsden, Alabama
People in Kyushu
Military personnel from Alabama
Jacksonville State University alumni
American firefighters
Businesspeople from Alabama
Alabama city council members
Democratic Party members of the Alabama House of Representatives
Deaths from the COVID-19 pandemic in Alabama
United States Marine Corps personnel of the Vietnam War